The Jarrow–Turnbull model is a widely used "reduced-form" credit risk model. 
It was published in 1995 by Robert A. Jarrow and Stuart Turnbull. 
Under the model, which returns the corporate's probability of default, bankruptcy is modeled as a statistical process.
The model extends the reduced-form model of Merton (1976)   to a random interest rates framework.

Reduced-form models are an approach to credit risk modeling that contrasts sharply with "structural credit models",
the best known of which is the Merton model of 1974.
Reduced-form models focus on modeling the probability of default as a statistical process, whereas structural-models inhere a microeconomic model of the firm's capital structure, deriving the (single-period) probability of default from the random variation in the (unobservable) value of the firm's assets.

Large financial institutions employ default models of both the structural and reduced-form types. The Merton structural default probabilities were first offered by KMV LLC in the early 1990s. KMV LLC was acquired by Moody's Investors Service in 2002.

See also 
 Credit default swap
 Credit derivatives
 Credit risk
 Merton model
 Probability of default

References

Further reading
 
 
 
 

Financial risk modeling
Financial_models
Credit risk